A State of Trance 2014 is the eleventh compilation album in the A State of Trance compilation series mixed and compiled by the Dutch DJ and record producer Armin van Buuren. It was released on 28 March 2014 by Armada Music. The album consists of two sets. The album charted in the Netherlands, Switzerland and Austria.

Track listing

Release history

References

Armin van Buuren compilation albums
Electronic compilation albums
2014 compilation albums